Bagauda zetteli is a species of assassin bug in the subfamily Emesinae found in Borneo. The species was described in 2005 and was found near the entrance to a cave.

References

Reduviidae
Endemic fauna of Borneo
Insects described in 2005